The study of how language influences thought has a long history in a variety of fields. There are two bodies of thought forming around this debate. One body of thought stems from linguistics and is known as the Sapir–Whorf hypothesis. There is a strong and a weak version of the hypothesis which argue for more or less influence of language on thought. The strong version, linguistic determinism, argues that without language there is and can be no thought while the weak version, linguistic relativity, supports the idea that there are some influences from language on thought. And on the opposing side, there are 'language of thought' theories (LOTH) which believe that public language is inessential to private thought (though the possibility remains that private thought when infused with inessential language diverges in predilection, emphasis, tone, or subsequent recollection). LOTH theories address the debate of whether thought is possible without language which is related to the question of whether language evolved for thought. These ideas are difficult to study because it proves challenging to parse the effects of culture versus thought versus language in all academic fields.

The main use of language is to transfer thoughts from one mind, to another mind. The bits of linguistic information that enter into one person's mind, from another, cause people to entertain a new thought with profound effects on his world knowledge, inferencing, and subsequent behavior. Language neither creates nor distorts conceptual life. Thought comes first, while language is an expression. There are certain limitations among language, and humans cannot express all that they think.

Language of thought 
Language of thought theories rely on the belief that mental representation has linguistic structure. Thoughts are "sentences in the head", meaning they take place within a mental language. Two theories work in support of the language of thought theory. Causal syntactic theory of mental practices hypothesizes that mental processes are causal processes defined over the syntax of mental representations. Representational theory of mind hypothesizes that propositional attitudes are relations between subjects and mental representations. In tandem, these theories explain how the brain can produce rational thought and behavior. All three of these theories were inspired by the development of modern logical inference. They were also inspired by Alan Turing's work on causal processes that require formal procedures within physical machines.

LOTH hinges on the belief that the mind works like a computer, always in computational processes. The theory believes that mental representation has both a combinatorial syntax and compositional semantics. The claim is that mental representations possess combinatorial syntax and compositional semantic—that is, mental representations are sentences in a mental language. Alan Turing's work on physical machines implementation of causal processes that require formal procedures was modeled after these beliefs.

Another prominent linguist, Steven Pinker, developed this idea of a mental language in his book The Language Instinct (1994). Pinker refers to this mental language as mentalese. In the glossary of his book, Pinker defines mentalese as a hypothetical language used specifically for thought. This hypothetical language houses mental representations of concepts such as the meaning of words and sentences.

Scientific hypotheses
 The Sapir–Whorf hypothesis in linguistics states that the grammatical structure of a mother language influences the way we perceive the world. The hypothesis has been largely abandoned by linguists as it has found very limited experimental support, at least in its strong form, linguistic determinism. For instance, a study showing that speakers of languages lacking a subjunctive mood such as Chinese experience difficulty with hypothetical problems has been discredited. Another study did show that subjects in memory tests are more likely to remember a given color if their mother language includes a word for that color; however, these findings do not necessarily support this hypothesis specifically. Other studies concerning the Sapir-Whorf hypothesis can be found in the "studies" section below.
 Chomsky's independent theory, founded by Noam Chomsky, considers language as one aspect of cognition. Chomsky's theory states that a number of cognitive systems exist, which seem to possess distinct specific properties. These cognitive systems lay the groundwork for cognitive capacities, like language faculty.  
 Piaget's cognitive determinism exhibits the belief that infants integrate experience into progressively higher-level representations. He calls this belief constructivism, which supports that infants progress from simple to sophisticated models of the world through a change mechanism that allows an infant to build on their lower-level representations to create higher-level ones. This view opposes nativist theories about cognition being composed of innate knowledge and abilities. 
 Vygotsky's theory on cognitive development, known as Vygotsky's theory of interchanging roles, supports the idea that social and individual development stems from the processes of dialectical interaction and function unification. Lev Vygotsky believed that before two years of age, both speech and thought develop in differing ways along with differing functions. The idea that relationship between thought and speech is ever-changing, supports Vygotsky's claims. Vygotsky's theory claims that thought and speech have different roots. And at the age of two, a child's thought and speech collide, and the relationship  between thought and speech shifts. Thought then becomes verbal and speech then becomes rational.
 According to the theory behind cognitive therapy, founded by Aaron T. Beck, our emotions and behavior are caused by our internal dialogue. We can change ourselves by learning to challenge and refute our own thoughts, especially a number of specific mistaken thought patterns called "cognitive distortions". Cognitive therapy has been found to be effective by empirical studies.
 In behavioral economics, according to experiments said to support the theoretical availability heuristic, people believe events that are more vividly described are more probable than those that are not. Simple experiments that asked people to imagine something led them to believe it to be more likely. The mere exposure effect may also be relevant to propagandistic repetition like the Big Lie. According to prospect theory, people make different economic choices based on how the matter is framed.

Studies concerning the Sapir-Whorf Hypothesis

Counting
Different cultures use numbers in different ways. The Munduruku culture for example, has number words only up to five. In addition, they refer to the number 5 as "a hand" and the number 10 as "two hands". Numbers above 10 are usually referred to as "many".

Perhaps the most different counting system from that of modern Western civilisation is the "one-two-many" system used by the Pirahã people. In this system, quantities larger than two are referred to simply as "many". In larger quantities, "one" can also mean a small amount and "many" a larger amount. Research was conducted in the Pirahã culture using various matching tasks. These are non-linguistic tasks that were analyzed to see if their counting system or more importantly their language affected their cognitive abilities. The results showed that they perform quite differently from, for example, an English speaking person who has a language with words for numbers more than two. For example, they were able to represent numbers 1 and 2 accurately using their fingers but as the quantities grew larger (up to 10), their accuracy diminished. This phenomenon is also called the "analog estimation", as numbers get bigger the estimation grows. Their declined performance is an  example of how a language can affect thought and great evidence to support the Sapir-Whorf Hypothesis.

Orientation
Language also seems to shape how people from different cultures orient themselves in space. For instance, many Australian Aboriginal Nations, such as the Kuuk Thaayorre, exclusively use cardinal-direction terms – north, south, east and west - and never define space relative to the observer. Instead of using terms like "left," "right," "back" and "forward," speakers from such cultures would say, "There is a spider on your northeast leg," or "Pass the ball to the south southwest." In fact, instead of "hello," the greeting in such cultures is, "Where are you going?" and sometimes even "Where are you coming from?" Such a greeting would be followed by a directional answer: "To the northeast in the middle distance." The consequence of using such language is that the speakers need to be constantly oriented in space, otherwise they would not be able to express themselves properly, or even get past a greeting. Speakers of languages that rely on absolute reference frames have a greater navigational ability and spatial knowledge compared to speakers of languages that use relative reference frames. In comparison with English users, speakers of languages such as Kuuk Thaayorre are also much better at staying oriented even in unfamiliar spaces, and there is strong evidence that their language is what enables them to do this.

Color

Language may influence color processing. Having more names for different colors, or different shades of colors, makes it easier both for children and for adults to recognize them. Research has found that all languages have names for black and white and that the colors defined by each language follow a certain pattern (i.e. a language with three colors also defines red, one with four defines green OR yellow, one with six defines blue, then brown, then other colors).

Other schools of thought
 General semantics is a school of thought founded by engineer Alfred Korzybski in the 1930s and later popularized by S.I. Hayakawa and others, which attempted to make language more precise and objective. It makes many basic observations of the English language, particularly pointing out problems of abstraction and definition. General semantics is presented as both a theoretical and a practical system whose adoption can reliably alter human behavior in the direction of greater sanity. It is considered to be a branch of natural science and includes methods for the stimulation of the activities of the human cerebral cortex, which is generally judged by experimentation. In this theory, semantics refers to the total response to events and actions, not just the words. The neurological, emotional, cognitive, semantic, and behavioral reactions to events determines the semantic response of a situation. This reaction can be referred to as semantic response, evaluative response, or total response.
 E-prime is a constructed language identical to the English language but lacking all forms of "to be". Its proponents claim that dogmatic thinking seems to rely on "to be" language constructs, and so by removing it we may discourage dogmatism.
 Neuro-linguistic programming, founded by Richard Bandler and John Grinder, claims that language "patterns" and other things can affect thought and behavior. It takes ideas from General Semantics and hypnosis, especially that of the famous therapist Milton Erickson. Many do not consider it a credible study, and it has no empirical scientific support.
 Advocates of non-sexist language including some feminists say that the English language perpetuates biases against women, such as using male-gendered terms such as "he" and "man" as generic. Many authors including those who write textbooks now conspicuously avoid that practice, in the case of the previous examples using words like "he or she" or "they" and "human race".
 Various other schools of persuasion directly suggest using language in certain ways to change the minds of others, including oratory, advertising, debate, sales, and rhetoric. The ancient sophists discussed and listed many figures of speech such as enthymeme and euphemism. The modern public relations term for adding persuasive elements to the interpretation of and commentary on news is called spin.

Popular culture
The Sapir–Whorf hypothesis is the premise of the 2016 science fiction film Arrival. The protagonist explains that "the Sapir–Whorf hypothesis is the theory that the language you speak determines how you think".

See also
 Embodied cognition
 Image schema
 Inner voice
 Kant and the Platypus: Essays on Language and Cognition by Umberto Eco
 Lev Vygotsky
 Origin of language
 Philosophy of language

References

Psycholinguistics
Cognition
Linguistic controversies